Konardan (also Romanized as Konārdān) is a village in Sirik Rural District, Byaban District, Minab County, Hormozgan Province, Iran. At the 2006 census, its population was 532, in 92 families.

References 

Populated places in Minab County